Olden is a village and urban area in the municipality of Stryn in Vestland county, Norway. Olden is located at the mouth of the Oldeelva river at the northern end of the Oldedalen valley on the southern shore of the Nordfjorden.

Attractions
Olden is a major tourist area. The cruise port in Olden had 102 cruise ship arrivals in 2019. It is a small arm off the main Jostedalsbreen glacier. There are two churches in Olden, the Old Olden Church (built in 1759) and Olden Church (built in 1934).

Notable residents
Svein Lundevall (born 1944) - Norwegian civil servant
Rune Skarstein (born 1940) - Norwegian radical economist

Media gallery

References

External links

Olden, Norway - typical architecture. Image of traditional Norwegian red architecture in Olden.

Stryn
Villages in Vestland